Luca Netz (born 15 May 2003) is a German professional footballer who plays as a left-back for  club Borussia Mönchengladbach.

Career
Netz was born in Berlin, Germany. He made his professional debut for Hertha BSC in the Bundesliga on 2 January 2021, coming on as a substitute in the 86th minute for Marvin Plattenhardt against Schalke 04. The home match finished as a 3–0 win for Hertha. On 13 February 2021, Netz scored his first Bundesliga goal in the 82nd minute against VfB Stuttgart. His goal equalized the game, and the match ended in a 1-1 draw.

Honours
Individual
Fritz Walter Medal U19 Silver: 2022
Fritz Walter Medal U17 Bronze: 2020

References

External links
 
 
 

2003 births
Living people
Footballers from Berlin
German footballers
Germany youth international footballers
Germany under-21 international footballers
Association football fullbacks
Hertha BSC II players
Hertha BSC players
Borussia Mönchengladbach players
Borussia Mönchengladbach II players
Bundesliga players
Regionalliga players